V.S.O.P. is a 1977 double live album by keyboardist Herbie Hancock, featuring acoustic jazz performances by the V.S.O.P. Quintet (Hancock, trumpeter Freddie Hubbard, saxophonist Wayne Shorter, bassist Ron Carter and drummer Tony Williams), jazz fusion/ jazz-funk performances by the ‘Mwandishi’ band (trumpeter Eddie Henderson, trombonist Julian Priester, flautist Bennie Maupin, bassist Buster Williams and drummer Billy Hart) and The Headhunters (saxophonist Maupin, guitarists Ray Parker Jr. and Wah Wah Watson, bass guitarist Paul Jackson, percussionist Kenneth Nash and drummer James Levi). The concert was advertised as a "Herbie Hancock Retrospective," and Miles Davis, who was several months into his temporary retirement, was advertised as playing with the V.S.O.P. group (thereby reconstituting Davis’ "Second Great Quintet" for the first time since 1968). According to concert attendees, on the night of the show a handwritten sign was posted on the lobby door announcing that Davis would not be playing, but that Hubbard would be appearing instead.

Track listing
 "Piano Introduction" - 4:33
 "Maiden Voyage" (Hancock) - 13:18
 "Nefertiti" (Shorter) - 5:17
 "Introduction of Players/Eye of the Hurricane" (Hancock) - 18:35
 "Toys" (Hancock) - 14:00
 "Introductions" - 1:47
 "You'll Know When You Get There" (Hancock) - 7:00
 "Hang Up Your Hang Ups" (Hancock, Jackson, Ragin) - 11:54
 "Spider" (Hancock, Jackson, Ragin) -10:12

Recorded live at the Newport Jazz Festival, New York City Center, New York City, Tuesday, June 29, 1976.

Tracks 1-4 performed by V.S.O.P., Tracks 5-7 performed by Mwandishi, Tracks 8-9 performed by the Headhunters.

Personnel

Musicians
on 1 
 Herbie Hancock – acoustic piano

on 2,3,4
 Herbie Hancock – acoustic piano
 Ron Carter – bass
 Tony Williams – drums
 Wayne Shorter – soprano saxophone, tenor saxophone
 Freddie Hubbard – trumpet, flugelhorn

on 5,6,7
 Herbie Hancock – electric piano (Rhodes, clavinet)
 Buster Williams – bass
 Billy Hart – drums
 Eddie Henderson – trumpet, flugelhorn, sound effects
 Bennie Maupin – alto flute
 Julian Priester – tenor & bass trombone

on 8,9
 Herbie Hancock – electric piano (Rhodes, clavinet), synthesizer/FX
 Melvin "Wah Wah" Ragin – guitar
 Ray Parker Jr. – guitar
 Paul Jackson – electric bass
 James Levi – drums
 Kenneth Nash – percussion
 Bennie Maupin – tenor & soprano saxophones, lyricon

Production
 Fred Catero – engineer
 David Rubinson – engineer, producer

References

Herbie Hancock live albums
1976 live albums
Albums produced by Dave Rubinson
Columbia Records live albums